Moomal Rano previously titled Mohabbat Ki Aakhri Kahani is a Pakistani short film directed by Siraj-ul-Haque. It has Ahsan Khan and Saba Qamar as lead roles and is written by Zafar Meraj. The short film is being produced by Zee TV Production as part of the Zeal For Unity festival.

Plot
Moomal Rano is the story of Sarmad and Nigar, modern day Romeo and Juliet frequenting a village haveli where they have been listening to folklore love tales since childhood. When Sarmad & Nigar take the decision of being together, they aren't accepted as lovers and are opposed by the same person who taught them lessons of love. Eventually, both meet a tragic fate as they are shot dead in the name of Honor Killing (Karo Kari). Mohabbat ki Aakhri Kahaani exposes the dark truth of honor killing which is a real burning issue on both sides of the border.

Cast

Lead
 Saba Qamar as Nigar
 Ahsan Khan as Sarmad

Recurring
 Salman Saeed as Zaman
 Zainab Jameel as Rani
 Asad Qureshi

Production 
Initially film was titled Mohabbat Ki Aakhri Kahani but the makers changed it to Moomal Rano. In a career spanning across 16 years, Siraj-ul-Haque has a repertoire of TV series such as Saari Bhool Hamari Thi and Bunty I Love You, films and documentaries to his credit. After tasting success as an assistant director for the acclaimed film Khamosh Pani, he went on to make his first feature film, Chandani. Moomal Rano is written by Zafar Miraj and the film will be screened in film festivals in India. Ahsan Khan was chosen as the main Male and whilst Saba Qamar was chosen as lead Female for the film. Saba in an Interview stated that she will be playing the role of a Sindhi Girl.

Music 
The music is done by Qasim Azhar, and OST Lyrics by Uzma Iftikhar. Whilst Sufi poetry is done by Shah Abdul Latif Bhattai.

References

External links

 http://zealforunity.com/ - Zeal For Unity

Pakistani short films